Fatehgarh Churian is a town located in Gurdaspur district in Punjab, India. It is nearby Gurdaspur city, the district headquarter. It is a municipal council of the Gurdaspur district. The city lies 15 kilometres from the Pakistani border. It is located 485 kilometres north of New Delhi, India.

Geography 
It is located at an altitude of 237 masl 256 km from the state capital, Chandigarh, in the time zone UTC +5:30.

Demographics
According to 2010 estimates, it had a population of 21,223 inhabitants.
Fatehgarh Churian is a Municipal Council city in district of Gurdaspur, Punjab. The Fatehgarh Churian city is divided into 13 wards for which elections are held every 5 years. The Fatehgarh Churian Municipal Council has population of 13,070 of which 6,881 are males while 6,189 are females as per report released by Census India 2011.

Population of Children with age of 0-6 is 1351 which is 10.34 % of total population of Fatehgarh Churian (M Cl). In Fatehgarh Churian Municipal Council, Female Sex Ratio is of 899 against state average of 895. Moreover Child Sex Ratio in Fatehgarh Churian is around 826 compared to Punjab state average of 846. Literacy rate of Fatehgarh Churian city is 85.46 % higher than state average of 75.84 %. In Fatehgarh Churian, Male literacy is around 89.09 % while female literacy rate is 81.46 %.

Out of total population of 13,170, 42.10% are Hindu, 41.12% are Sikh, 16.06% are Christian, 0.58% Muslims, 0.03% Jain, 0.02% Buddhist 0.05% others and 0.06% who did not state their religion as of 2011.

History
Prior to the 18th century, Fatehgarh Churian was an area dominated by the Bandesha Muslim Jut Clan. During the 18th century, the Kanhaiya Misl was founded by Jai Singh Sandhu, from the village Kahna, and his brother Baghel Singh Sandhu, from the village Julke, both a few kilometers from Lahore. To expand their territory under the flag of Khalsa, they first established themselves in Sohian, a village near Amritsar. Baghel Singh Kanhaiya, with his son Haqiqat Singh, then established Sangatpura, a village  from Fatehgarh Churian. A few years later, Jai Singh established his headquarters at Batala. In 1760, Haqiqat Singh Kanhaiya included Fatehgarh Churian into his territory and built a fort there. The area was earlier known as Churianvala. After his win, he named the area as Fatehgarh, but because the area was called Churianvala, the area slowly became known as Fatehgarh Churian. Fatehgarh Churian became the headquarters of Haqiqat Singh. Haqiqat Singh Kanhaiya Sandhu further united Kotli Soorat Malhi, Kalanur, Taragarh, Narot Jaimal Singh and many villages under his territory. Fatehgarh Churian became the capital of his kingdom, and became very prosperous under his policies. To form an alliance with the Phulkian Misl, Haqiqat Singh married his son Jaimal Singh Kanhaiya to Sahib Kaur, daughter of Raja Amar Singh of Patiala. In 1782, Haqiqat Singh Kanhaiya died, and control was passed down to his son Jaimal Singh Kanhaiya.

Kharak Singh, son of Maharaja Ranjit Singh, was married to Chand Kaur, daughter of Sardar Jaimal Singh Kanhaiya in this town. Sardar Jaimal Singh Kanhaiya built a temple called Panj Mandir with a Pucca tank, which still stands.  The 180-year-old temple carries the legacy of Punjab in the form of unique frescoes adorning monuments. Ten acres of land were allocated to build Panj Mandir by Jaimal Singh Kanhaiya during the marriage of his daughter Chand Kaur to Kharak Singh. Initially the temple was built as Gurudwara for the marriage ceremony but years later during British rule, it was used as a mandir by Hindus. Samadhi of Rani Chandi Kaur is present inside the temple. The marriage was celebrated throughout Punjab, and Fatehgarh Churian became the center of attraction. For the convenience of Maharaja Ranjit Singh's guests, Jaimal Singh Kanhaiya built a huge pond and 12 darhi. Later on, his son Chand Singh Kanhaiya, on the request of his Purohit, built a temple near this pond and 12 darhi, which is today known as Talab Wala Mandir.

Gagranwala Mandir is the most popular temple in Fatehgarh Churian. It was constructed by Chanda Singh Kanhaiya, on his land, for the local Hindu population. The temple is famous for its Golden Gagrans, donated by Chanda Singh Kanhaiya. After the Second Anglo-Sikh War, most of the estates of Chanda Singh Kanhaiya were captured by the British, because Chanda Singh Kanhaiya hadn't sided with the British. After Fatehgarh Churian was included in the British territory, Diwans of Kanhaiya Misl pledged allegiance to the British Crown. This broke the relationship between Diwans and Kanhaiyas, and most of the estates of Chanda Singh Kanhaiya were granted to Diwans by the British. Diwan Dilbag Rai, among the Diwans, was made honorary magistrate of Fatehgarh Churian by the British in the early 20th century, and represented the local populace. The family of Kanhaiyas still lives on the old fort land of Fatehgarh Churian.

Before 1947, the town had a majority Muslim population that included Shias and Sunnis. The Sunni and Shia Muslims were roughly equal in numbers. After the partition of India, several Hindu and Sikh migrants from newly-formed Pakistan settled in Fatehgarh Churian. Mohinder Singh Kanhaiya and his brothers provided safe passage to Muslims going to newly-formed Pakistan. The kindness of Mohinder Singh Kanhaiya spread to Muslims of nearby areas, and many of them travelled to Fatehgarh Churian and were sheltered in the old fort, and were later helped by the Sardars to reach Pakistan safely. The refugees from Pakistan were helped by Mohinder Singh Kanhaiya to setup their homes, and much land was donated by him to the poor people. Some mosques were converted to Gurudwaras after Partition.

Politics 
The city is part of the Fatehgarh Churian Assembly Constituency.

Events

Fatehgarh hosts a lot of religious events and people from nearby villages visit the city to be a part of the celebrations. Many local clubs and religious societies help in the celebrations. Organizing Sant Samelans, gatherings of seers and saints, and Shoba Yatras are now traditions of the town. Nearby historic landmarks include Dhianpur Dhaam, Ramdass, and Chola Sahib. The River Ravi is also close by.

Historical Places

Gagranwala Mandir, Panj Mandir, Talab(built by Kanhaiya Misl), Samadhs of Kanhaiya Misl Sardars are the places one must checkout in their lifetime when visiting Fatehgarh Churian.

References

Cities and towns in Gurdaspur district